Oudnin el kadhi or wdinet el cadi (آذان القاضي "Judge's ears" in Arabic) are a type of pastry commonly found in Tunisia.

Flour, eggs, oil, orange flower water, sugar and salt are mixed, and the resulting dough is rolled and cut into strips. These are then dipped in hot oil and rolled around a fork. After draining, they are coated in honey or syrup or sprinkled with powdered sugar. Sesame seeds are sometimes used as topping.

References

Arab cuisine
Tunisian cuisine
Arab pastries
Deep fried foods